Madrasa El Bachia is one of the madrasahs of the medina of Tunis, located in the Rue des Libraires, near the Al-Zaytuna Mosque and in front of the Guachachine Hammam.

History 

Madrasa El Bachia was built in 1752 during the reign of the Husainid Abu l-Hasan Ali I. It was dedicated to the Hanafi education.

In the 1980s, and with the help of the ministry of Vocational Training and Employment, the madrasa was re-established once more as a training center.

Description 
The madrasa has 13 rooms for students, a prayer room and a library. It has a public fountain close to the entrance, added later for visitors.

The building showcases the classical architecture of a madrasa: the courtyard gives access to the rooms through porticos surrounding three sides while the fourth gave access to the prayer room and the library.

References

External links 
 

Bachia